The 1901 Massacres of Serbs were multiple massacres of Serbs in the Kosovo Vilayet of Ottoman Empire (modern-day Serbia, Kosovo and North Macedonia), carried out by Albanians.

Massacres 
Serbs were maltreated and accused of being Serbian agents. Panic ensued, and Serbs, primarily from the border areas fled to Serbia. Albanians who participated in the Greco-Turkish War (1897) used weapons not turned in to the authorities against the Serbs in Old Serbia. The Albanians went on a rampage massacring Serbs in Pristina. Ibarski Kolašin (now known as North Kosovo), a forested region made up of 40 villages, largely inhabited by Serbs, where Serbian teachers and priests were active, had long irritated the Albanians and Ottoman government; Serbs were continuously maltreated in the region. The Serbian government observed the developments in Kolašin, and did not remain idle. The situation became serious, with Serbs being smuggled arms by Serbia to defend themselves. In the summer of 1901, Albanians massacred Serbs in the Kolašin area.  The atrocities prompted the Russian government to intervene at the Porte.

Reactions

Russia 

Initially, the Porte did not suppress the Albanian movement nor protect the Serbs. Russia demanded that the Albanians and Turkish gendarmeries be punished and the Serbs be allowed to keep the arms for protection. The Porte answered by mass arrests and criminalizing the Albanian language. The governor (vali) was dismissed, and several other anti-Serb officials, and Albanian chieftains who had been especially cruel, were removed from their posts.

Austria-Hungary 
Austria-Hungary, supported the Albanians, and tried to downplay the massacre. The events were instrumental in the "Kolašin affair", a diplomatic conflict between Austria-Hungary, which supported the Albanians, and Serbia, which was supported by Russia.

See also
Attacks on Serbs during the Serbian–Ottoman War (1876–78)

References

Sources

Further reading

1901 in Kosovo
1901 in the Ottoman Empire
1901 in Serbia
Conflicts in 1901
Anti-Serbian sentiment
Mass murder in 1901
Massacres in 1901
Serb
Albanian war crimes
Kosovo Serbs
Kosovo vilayet
Ottoman Serbia
Massacres of Serbs
Russia–Serbia relations
Austria-Hungary–Serbia relations
North Kosovo
Ottoman Albania
Serbian–Albanian conflict
massacres of Serbs
massacres of Serbs